"Intentions" is a song by English electronic music production duo Gorgon City. It features vocals from singer Nikki Cislyn and strings from British group Clean Bandit. The song was released in the United Kingdom as a digital download on 10 May 2013. The song has charted in Belgium.

Music video
A music video to accompany the release of "Intentions" was created by Jason Baker. It was first released onto YouTube on 6 May 2013 at a total length of three minutes and thirty-seven seconds. It has received more than one million views as of March 2016.

Track listing

Chart performance

Weekly charts

Release history

References

2013 songs
2013 singles
Gorgon City songs
Clean Bandit songs
Black Butter Records singles
Polydor Records singles
Songs written by Kye Gibbon
Songs written by Matt Robson-Scott